is a Japanese professional footballer who plays as a right-back for Fortuna Düsseldorf in the .

Club career
Born in Chiba Prefecture, Japan, Uchino started his career with Shinmatsudo SC. He later joined professional sides Kashiwa Reysol and JEF United Chiba, before moving to Germany to sign with 1. FC Düren in 2018. The following year, he signed for Alemannia Aachen, and would go on to make 35 appearances in the Regionalliga.

A move to Fortuna Düsseldorf would follow, and Uchino would go on to make a number of appearances for the club's reserve team, before making his 2. Bundesliga debut in March 2022.

International career
In March 2022, Uchino was called up to the Japan national under-21 football team for the Dubai Cup.

Career statistics

Club

Notes

References

2001 births
Living people
Japanese footballers
Japan youth international footballers
Association football defenders
Regionalliga players
2. Bundesliga players
Kashiwa Reysol players
JEF United Chiba players
Alemannia Aachen players
Fortuna Düsseldorf players
Japanese expatriate footballers
Japanese expatriate sportspeople in Germany
Expatriate footballers in Germany